Ştrand Stadium is a multi-use stadium in Piteşti, Romania. It is currently used mostly for football matches. The stadium can host 2,500 people.

Football venues in Romania
Pitești
Buildings and structures in Argeș County